The Iran Pen Society is an Iranian association of writers, formed in 1998 by some activists in the field of writing, but officially began operating after obtaining a legal license from Ministry of Culture and Islamic Guidance on 27 May 1999. The Iran Pen Society is the only official legal association of litterateurs whose members include poets, writers, critics, translators, researchers and thinkers in the humanities. The association is not affiliated with any political, religious or governmental party, group, organization, domestic or foreign. The Iran Pen Society has about 200 members.

Purposes
The following are some of the goals of the establishment of the Iran Pen Society:
 Unite the litterateurs of the country committed to guild issues
 Providing the conditions for a more productive presence of litterateurs in the process of social and cultural developments and events in Iranian society
 Defend the freedom of expression, thought and pen within the country's constitution
 Spreading the highest spiritual and human values in the pen field
 Improving the quality of the works presented in the field of pen, by creating suitable contexts for exchange of information and experiences among litterateurs
 Creating a centrality for communicating between artistic and cultural centers and litterateurs
 Move towards introducing literature, art and intellectual products of the country to other cultural and artistic communities in the world
 Supporting the intellectual property rights of writers and facilitating the process of publishing their works
 Resolving legal disputes and legal issues regarding literary works and its practitioners
 Improving the quality of Iranian society's study by presenting and implementing appropriate plans in this regard
 Providing intellectual and consulting services to other institutions to improve the quality regulations about litterateurs

Founders
Some of the founders of the Iran Pen Society are:
 Hamid Sabzevari
 Abdolkarim Beeazar Shirazi
 Ali Akbar Velayati
 Ali Larijani
 Razieh Tojjar
 Shamoddin Rahmani
 Ali Moallem
 Hamid Gerogan
 Mohsen Chiniforoushan
 Mohammad Reza Sarshar
 Ebrahim Hassanbeigi
 Mohammad Mirkiani
 Mohsen Parviz
 Samira Aslanpour
 Seyyed Mahdi Shojaee
 Maryam Jamshidi
 Maryam Sabaqzadeh Irani
 Mohammadreza Javadi

Golden Pen Award
The Iran Pen Society Established the Golden Pen Award in Iran. This prize is for Best Poetry, Fiction, Research and Literary Criticism works and awarded annually on National Pen Day in Iran. The Golden Pen Festival was held to 16 courses in Iran so far.

Important actions
The Iran Pen Society has pursued many activities in the field of Iranian art and culture, the most important of which are:
 The suggestion of naming a day known as "World Pen Day in the Islamic World", this day was finally registered and announced in the official calendar of Iran as National Pen Day (14 Tir, July 5).
 Proposal to grant equivalent university degrees to poets, writers, scholars and literary critics, like other disciplines. After years of effort, the proposal was finally approved in October 2006 by the Supreme Council of the Cultural Revolution.
 Proposal to publication of one hundred works (fiction, poetry, research and literary criticism) from one hundred novice author, with the participation of Ministry of Culture and Islamic Guidance. The proposal was approved and dozens of titles were published so far.
 Proposal to publish 40000 pages of the work of forty pioneering poets and authors, with the participation of Ministry of Culture and Islamic Guidance. It has been approved and has published more than 28653 pages of these works so far.
 Establishment of the literary-cultural quarterly magazine "Ashabe Qalam" (Companions of the Pen).
 Establishment of the specialized monthly magazine "Eghlime Naghd" (The Criticize Climate).
 Donate dozens of loans to members.
 Efforts to form the "Union of Islamic Writers".
 Meetings and consultations with some foreign literary and cultural organizations and entities (including the Union of Arab Writers).
 Holding courses in storytelling with the participation of the Foundation for the Preservation and Publication of Sacred Defense Works and Values, Story Critic Sessions, and "Salam bar Nasrollah" Literary Festival with the participation of relevant institutions.

See also
 Society for the National Heritage of Iran
 Glory Entertainment (The Association of Tehran Young Voice Actors)
 Academy of Persian Language and Literature
 Owj Arts and Media Organization
 Society of Iranian Calligraphists

References

External links
 Iran Pen Society official website
 Office of Iran Pen Society on the map
 A photo report: 17th Golden Pen Award

Iranian literature
1999 establishments in Iran
Iranian writers' organisations
Cultural organisations based in Iran
Freedom of expression organizations
Freedom of expression in Iran
Freedom of speech in Iran
Trade unions in Iran
Professional associations based in Iran
Writing circles